Agalina Glacier is a  long and  wide glacier on Pefaur (Ventimiglia) Peninsula, Danco Coast on the west side of Antarctic Peninsula, situated east of Poduene Glacier and west of Krapets Glacier. It drains northwards, and flows into both Graham Passage and the west arm of Salvesen Cove.

The glacier is named after Agalina Point on the Bulgarian Black Sea Coast.

Location
British mapping in 1978.

See also
 List of glaciers in the Antarctic

Maps
 British Antarctic Territory.  Scale 1:200000 topographic map. DOS 610 Series, Sheet W 64 60.  Directorate of Overseas Surveys, Tolworth, UK, 1978.
 Antarctic Digital Database (ADD). Scale 1:250000 topographic map of Antarctica. Scientific Committee on Antarctic Research (SCAR), 1993–2016.

References
 Bulgarian Antarctic Gazetteer. Antarctic Place-names Commission. (details in Bulgarian, basic data in English)
 Agalina Glacier. SCAR Composite Gazetteer of Antarctica

External links
 Agalina Glacier. Copernix satellite image

Glaciers of Danco Coast
Bulgaria and the Antarctic